ABC Sports Indy Racing is a racing computer game made in 1997. It was officially licensed by the Indy Racing League.

Gameplay
The game is based on 1996–97 Indy Racing League season and features the drivers and the tracks from that season. The game also features the USAC Silver Crown Series, USAC Sprint Cars, and USAC Midgets that can race at Indianapolis Raceway Park, Phoenix Raceway, Eldora Speedway, Winchester Speedway, and Terre Haute Action Track.

Notably, alcohol car sponsors appear in the game despite often being censored in other video games based on real-life racing series. 

The game also featured online multiplayer that supported up to four players.

Reception

References

1997 video games
IndyCar Series video games
Windows games
Indy Racing
Multiplayer and single-player video games
Video games developed in the United States